Rennard James Strickland  was  a Philip H. Knight Professor of Law and former dean at the University of Oregon School of Law and senior scholar in residence at the University of Oklahoma College of Law.

Strickland earned his B.A. at Northeastern State University before getting his J.D. from the University of Virginia, M.A. from the University of Arkansas, and S.J.D. from the University of Virginia. After graduation, Strickland joined the faculty of the University of Arkansas School of Law and following it taught law at St. Mary's University, the University of Tulsa, the University of West Florida, the University of Washington, and at the University of Wisconsin. In 1985 he became dean at the Southern Illinois University School of Law and from 1990 to 1995 served as director of the Center for the Study of American Indian Law and Policy, before becoming professor at the University of Oklahoma College of Law. This was followed by a dean position at the same university and from 1997 to 2002, he also served as dean of Oklahoma City University from 1995 to 1997 and the University of Oregon School of Law.

Strickland was elected president of the Association of American Law Schools, served with the Society of American Law Teachers, and was a member of the American Bar Association.

Rennard Strickland died on January 5, 2021, at the age of 80 in Norman, Oklahoma.

References

External links
Interview with Dr. Rennard Strickland Osage Author & Historian

20th-century births
Living people
American legal scholars
Scholars of Native American law
Northeastern State University alumni
University of Virginia School of Law alumni
University of Arkansas alumni
University of Arkansas School of Law faculty
St. Mary's University, Texas faculty
University of Tulsa College of Law faculty
University of Washington School of Law faculty
University of Wisconsin Law School faculty
Southern Illinois University faculty
University of Oregon School of Law faculty
University of Oklahoma faculty
American Bar Association
Year of birth missing (living people)
Place of birth missing (living people)